John Iacono is an American computer scientist specializing in data structures, algorithms and computational geometry. He is one of the inventors of the tango tree, the first known competitive binary search tree data structure.

Iacono obtained his M.S. at Stevens Institute of Technology and his Ph.D.  in 2001 at Rutgers, the State University of New Jersey under the supervision of Michael Fredman. He is a Sloan Research Fellow and Fulbright Scholar. Formerly a professor of computer science in the New York University Tandon School of Engineering, he now works as a professor at the Université libre de Bruxelles.

References

External links 
 Personal web page

American computer scientists
People from Livingston, New Jersey
Rutgers University alumni
Stevens Institute of Technology alumni
Researchers in geometric algorithms
Living people
Year of birth missing (living people)
Polytechnic Institute of New York University faculty
Academic staff of the Université libre de Bruxelles
Sloan Research Fellows